Henry Adler (June 28, 1915 – September 30, 2008) was an American jazz drummer, teacher, author, and publisher. He taught drummer Buddy Rich how to read music and co-wrote Buddy Rich's Modern Interpretation of Snare Drum Rudiments, published in 1942.

Early years
A native of New York City, Adler grew up during the Depression. He bought his first snare drum when he was thirteen and learned to play it without formal instruction. Two years later, he got a job playing at a hotel in Belmar, New Jersey. He began lessons with a professional pit drummer from the Palace Theater and studied timpani in his high school orchestra.

Meeting Rich
One of Adler's former students introduced Adler to Buddy Rich. "The kid told me he played better than Krupa. Buddy was only in his teens at the time and his friend was my first pupil. Buddy played and I watched his hands. Well, he knocked me right out. He did everything I wanted to do, and he did it with such ease. When I met his folks, I asked them who his teacher was. 'He never studied', they told me. That made me feel very good. I realized that it was something physical, not only mental, that you had to have."

In the same 1985 interview, Adler clarified the extent of his relationship with Rich and their collaboration on the instructional book. "Sure, he studied with me, but he didn't come to me to learn how to hold the drumsticks. I set out to teach Buddy to read. He'd take six lessons, go on the road for six weeks and come back. He didn't practice. He couldn't, because wherever the guy went, he was followed around by admiring drummers. He didn't have time to practice. Tommy Dorsey wanted Buddy to write a book and he told him to get in touch with me. I did the book and Tommy wrote the foreword. Technically, I was Buddy's teacher, but I came along after he had already acquired his technique."

Alder and Rich wrote Buddy Rich's Modern Interpretation of Snare Drum Rudiments (1942), which became a standard text for drummers. After the book was published, Adler opened a drum store in New York City. His students included Louie Bellson, Roy Burns, Sandy Feldstein, Alvin Stoller, and Dave Tough. He developed the Adler Technique after studying the movements of the arm, hand, and wrist. His technique intended to omit wasted motion. It concentrated on sight reading, mind body coordination, dexterity of right and left hands, and the study of diverse musical genres. During the 1960s, he started the Henry Adler Music Publishing Company. His books include How to Play Latin American Rhythm Instruments, Hand Development Techniques, and 4-Way Coordination: A Method Book for the Development of Complete Independence on the Drum Set. He also published instruction books by other authors. He had a small role in the move Desperately Seeking Susan in 1985.

Adler revised Modern Interpretation of Snare Drum Rudiments in the 1990s with Ted MacKenzie and it was published in 2005.

Awards and honors
 Hall of Fame induction, Percussive Arts Society, 1988

Discography

As sideman
 The Uncollected Larry Clinton & His Orchestra 1937–38, Larry Clinton (Hindsight, 1977) 
 Jump Georgie Jump, Georgie Auld (Hep, 1993)

References

External links
 Interview with Adler at NAMM Oral History Library, 2007

1915 births
2008 deaths
20th-century American drummers
20th-century American male musicians
American jazz bandleaders
American jazz drummers
American male drummers
Bebop drummers
Mainstream jazz drummers
American male jazz musicians
Swing drummers